Olympic Pylon is a 1956 ceramic sculpture by Australian artist Arthur Boyd. It was included on the Victorian Heritage Database on 7 May 2001.

References

1956 sculptures
1956 Summer Olympics
Buildings and structures in the City of Melbourne (LGA)
Sculptures in Australia
Heritage-listed buildings in Melbourne
Ceramic sculptures